Stigmella gossypii is a moth of the family Nepticulidae. It is found in Puerto Rico and Florida.

Mines can be found in March and early April, with adults on wings 10 days later. There is probably one generation per year.

The larvae feed on Gossypium barbadense. They mine the leaves of their host plant. The mine is slender, sinuous and located on the lower surface (but visible from the upper surface) of the leaf. In the first half of the mine, the frass is deposited in arcuate waves and is granular while in latter half it is a single, continuous line. There are several mines on a single leaf that cross and anastomose frequently.

External links
A taxonomic revision of the North American species of Stigmella (Lepidoptera: Nepticulidae)

Nepticulidae
Moths described in 1930
Moths of North America